CA 37, CA-37, or California 37 may refer to:

 California's 37th congressional district, a congressional district in the U.S. state of California
 California State Route 37, a state highway in the northern part of California
 , a United States Navy cruiser
 California 37 (album), the sixth studio album from pop rock band Train
 Calcium-37 (Ca-37 or 37Ca), an isotope of calcium
 Caproni Ca.37, an Italian aircraft